Sally Horsfall Eaton Centre is an academic building in Toronto, Ontario, Canada. It is home to Toronto Metropolitan University's Studies for Community Health. The building is named after Sally Horsfall Eaton, the third wife of businessman John Craig Eaton II.

Located at 99 Gerrard Street East, it is a four-storey structure built on top of the existing Eric Palin Hall. It was completed in 2002 by Rounthwaite, Dick & Hadley, with Lett Smith Architects.

The building houses:
 Child and Youth Care 
 Disability Studies 
 Early Childhood Education 
 Health Services Management 
 Midwifery
 Nurse Practitioner
 Nursing 
 Social Work
 Activation Coordinator/Gerontology

References

 Sally Horsfall Eaton Centre

Toronto Metropolitan University buildings